The Ålandic Left was a political party in Åland, Finland.

History
The party contested the 1979 and 1983 elections for the Parliament of Åland, but failed to win a seat.

Election results
1979: 195 (2.1%)
1983: 244 (2.3%)

References

Defunct political parties in Åland
Socialist parties in Finland